is a type of shaded green tea from Japan. It differs from the standard sencha (a classic unshaded green tea) in being grown under the shade rather than the full sun. The name "gyokuro" translates as "jewel dew" (or "jade dew"). While most sencha is from the  cultivar of Camellia sinensis, gyokuro is often made from a specialized variety such as Asahi, Okumidori, Yamakai, and Saemidori.

Cultivation 

Though it is categorized as a type of sencha according to production methods, gyokuro cultivation differs from other sencha teas. Gyokuro tea leaves are shielded from the sun for at least 20 days before being harvested. This causes both the amino acid theanine and the alkaloid caffeine in the tea leaves to increase, which yields a sweet flavour. The tea also gains a distinct aroma from the covering process.

Market 
Gyokuro is one of the most expensive types of sencha available in Japan. The name was originally the product name of the tea made by Yamamotoyama. The tea was first discovered by Yamamotoyama's sixth owner, Yamamoto Kahei, in 1835 (Tenpō year 6). The process was completed by another manufacturer at the start of the Meiji period.

More than 40% of gyokuro is produced in Yame, and in the national tea jury in August 2007, Yamecha held all the ranking positions from first to 26th as the best gyokuro.

See also
 List of Japanese teas
 Theanine, a nootropic extracted from Gyokuro

References

Japanese tea
Green tea
Japanese cuisine terms